The Medicine Man is a 1917 American silent Western film directed by Clifford Smith and starring Roy Stewart, Ann Forrest and Percy Challenger.

Cast
 Roy Stewart as Jim Walton
 Ann Forrest as Edith Strang
 Percy Challenger as Seth Hopkins
 Aaron Edwards as Joe Maslone
 William Fairbanks as Luther Hill 
 Wilbur Higby as Doc Hamilton

References

Bibliography
 Paul C. Spehr & Gunnar Lundquist. American Film Personnel and Company Credits, 1908-1920. McFarland, 1996.

External links
 

1917 films
1917 Western (genre) films
American black-and-white films
Triangle Film Corporation films
Films directed by Clifford Smith
Silent American Western (genre) films
1910s English-language films
1910s American films